Anwesh Sharma (born 20 February 2001) is an Indian cricketer. He made his List A debut on 21 February 2021, for Sikkim in the 2020–21 Vijay Hazare Trophy. He made his first-class debut on 17 February 2022, for Sikkim in the 2021–22 Ranji Trophy.

References

External links
 

2001 births
Living people
Indian cricketers
Sikkim cricketers
Place of birth missing (living people)